Whittome is a surname. Notable people with the surname include:

 Irene Whittome (born 1942), Canadian artist
 Nadia Whittome (born 1996), British politician